The Miracle in Valby is a 1989 Danish-Swedish drama film written and directed by Åke Sandgren, and starring Jakob Katz, Troels Asmussen, Lina Englund, and . The film was produced by Nordisk Film, won the awards for Best Film, Best Director and Best Screenplay at the Guldbagge Award.

Plot
The story follows a teenage radio amateur who discovers a frequency that can transport him back in time.

Cast
 Jakob Katz as Sven
 Troels Asmussen as Bo
 Lina Englund as Petra
  as Hanna
 Gregers Reimann as the boy from the middle ages
 Jens Okking as Bo's Father
 Ingvar Hirdwall as Petra's Father
  as Sven's Mother
  as the vicar 
 Mona Seilitz as Petra's Mother

References

External links
 
 
 

1989 films
1989 drama films
Danish drama films
Swedish drama films
Danish-language films
1980s Swedish-language films
Best Film Guldbagge Award winners
Films whose director won the Best Director Guldbagge Award
Films directed by Åke Sandgren
1980s Swedish films